Senator Kent may refer to:

Joseph Kent (1779–1837), U.S. Senator from Maryland from 1833 to 1837
Martha Kent, fictional adoptive mother of Superman and U.S. Senator from Kansas in the TV series, Smallville
Marvin Kent (1816–1908), Ohio State Senate
Mary Lou Kent (1921–1981), Illinois State Senate
Moss Kent (1766–1838), New York State Senate
Susan Kent (politician), Minnesota State Senate